James Verle Lash (November 12, 1951 – 31 May 2019) was an American football wide receiver in the National Football League in the 1970s and played on three Super Bowl teams.  He attended Garfield High School in Akron, Ohio, the same high school that fellow NFL wide receiver Steve Craig attended. His five-year pro-career was spent with the Minnesota Vikings in which he helped lead to Super Bowl VIII, Super Bowl IX and Super Bowl XI all coming up a bit short against the dynasty teams of the Miami Dolphins, the Pittsburgh Steelers and the Oakland Raiders.

Jim Lash died May 31, 2019 in his hometown of Akron, Ohio.

External links
Stats from databasefootball.com

1951 births
2019 deaths
Players of American football from Akron, Ohio
American football wide receivers
Northwestern Wildcats football players
Minnesota Vikings players
San Francisco 49ers players